

Urququcha (Quechua urqu male, qucha lake, "male lake", also spelled Orcococha) is a lake in the Arequipa Region in Peru. It is located in the Arequipa Province, Tarucani District. Urququcha lies southeast of Chinaqucha, northwest of a mountain named Suri Wasi.

References 

Lakes of Peru
Lakes of Arequipa Region